Trinie Dalton is an author, editor, and curator based in Los Angeles. She teaches creative writing.

Biography
She received a BA in creative writing and poetry from University of Southern California and an MFA from the Bennington College Writing Seminars. 

She has taught at Columbia University, Bard College, Milton Avery Graduate School, Vermont College of Fine Arts, University of Southern California, Dornsife School of Liberal Arts, English Department Art Center College of Design, NYU, Steinhardt Department of Art and Art Professions, and Pratt Institute, Writing for Performance, Publication, and Media Department.

Dalton is the editor of “Mythtym,” a new anthology of essays, fiction and artwork which includes the writing of Dodie Bellamy, Amy Gerstler, and Rachel Kushner among others.

She is known for making handmade publications of her books and including participatory elements of her projects.

Honors
Her book Wide Eyed (Akashic) was a finalist for the Believer Magazine book award.

Bibliography

Anthologies
 MYTHTYM (Picturebox/Distributed Art Publishers, 2008)
 Dear New Girl Or Whatever Your Name Is (McSweeney’s, 2005, co-edited with Lisa Wagner and Eli Horowitz

Essays, reviews
 "As Good as a Witch." for HOUSEGUEST: FRANCESCA GABBIANI. 2009. 
 "Free Your Beast: Reviving the Adult Animal Tale." 2006. 
 "The Beginners by Rebecca Wolff." Bookforum. 2011.
  "Girl Zines: Making Media, Doing Feminism." 2010.
 "The Importance of Being Iceland by Eileen Myles." 2009.

Books
 Wide-Eyed. Akashic Books. 2005.
 A Unicorn is Born. Harry N. Abrams. 2007
 Sweet Tomb. Madras. 2010
 Baby Geisha. Two Dollar Radio. 2012

Exhibitions
 “The Joy of Looking: Contemporary Video Art from LA & NY,” Curated by Dalton for Cinemarfa (May 2012, Marfa)
 “Sync Speaks,” Group exhibition and workshop at Synchronicity Space (July 2011, Los Angeles)
 “Homunculi,” Curated by Dalton for CANADA Gallery (July 2011, New York)
 “History of Photocopy + Copy Art,” Group exhibition and workshop for Las Cienegas Projects (January 2010, Los Angeles)
 “Bruno Munari + Xerography,” Group exhibition and workshop for PIG Sunday School Series, Curated by Gelatin for Deitch Projects (August 2009, New York)

References

External links
Artist website

Living people
21st-century American writers
21st-century American women writers
Year of birth missing (living people)
University of Southern California alumni
Bennington College alumni